Matthew Rose (born September 30, 1972) is a British-born journalist for the Wall Street Journal in New York, where he is the enterprise editor.

Biography
Rose is the son of Susan and Philip Rose of London, England. He graduated with first class honors from Oxford University and  has an MA in international affairs from the Johns Hopkins University School of Advanced International Studies (SAIS). Rose was previously deputy bureau chief in Washington D.C., and a page-one editor for the Wall Street Journal. He has covered the media industry for the Wall Street Journal and the technology industry for the Wall Street Journal Europe.

In 2000, Rose married Kimberley Ann Strassel in Buxton, Oregon. The couple have three children. They have since divorced.

Career
In 2016 Rose moved from being deputy Washington, D.C. bureau chief for the Wall Street Journal to become enterprise editor of the Journal.

Notable articles
Rose's 2004 essay on poet Felix Dennis, Felix Dennis, No Pro, Has Spotted His Foe: Poetry's Status Quo; He Likes Meter and Rhyme, Calls Free Verse a Crime And Dog Poems Sublime, was "much discussed.".

In 2007 tensions between Rose and Jonathan Franzen drew attention.

References

External links
 Interview with Mediabistro, July 22, 2003

1972 births
Living people
The Wall Street Journal people
British male journalists
British Jews
British emigrants to the United States
Alumni of the University of Oxford
Johns Hopkins University alumni
20th-century British journalists
20th-century British male writers
21st-century British journalists
21st-century British male writers